This is a list of countries ordered by annual per capita consumption of milk, excluding butter.

See also
List of countries by tea consumption per capita
 List of dairy products

References

Milk consumption
Food- and drink-related lists
Milk